Feng Shui 2 (stylized Feng Shui 二) is a 2014 Philippine supernatural horror film. It is a sequel to the first film from 2004. Kris Aquino reprises her role as Joy Ramirez and Coco Martin plays Lester Anonuevo, the new owner of the 'cursed bagua'. The film co-stars Cherry Pie Picache, Carmi Martin, Ian Veneracion, and Joonee Gamboa. It focuses on Lester (Martin) who, upon getting the cursed bagua, starts to have luck and prosperity, but with deadly consequences. This film was Star Cinema's official entry in the 2014 Metro Manila Film Festival.

It is also the first Filipino movie to be rendered in 4D and was exclusively shown at the XD Theater of SM Mall of Asia under a partnership of SM Lifestyle Entertainment and Star Cinema.

Plot
Ten years after the twins discover the cursed bagua mirror in Joy Ramirez's old house, the new owner of the mirror is horrified after finding her dead husband lying on a stuffed tiger toy, his death corresponding to his birth on the year of the Tiger, as a result of the good luck from the cursed bagua. The owner is urged to escape their condominium unit by what turn our to be the spirits of her twin daughters, one of whom shot her sister and father before killing herself. She jumps off the terrace and lands on monkey bars. Coincidentally, the mirror's owner was born in the year of the Monkey.

Lester Añonuevo, a hustler living in a slum, breaks into a Taoist temple to take the bagua mirror, which has been stored for safekeeping by Hsui Liao from the condo, upon orders of a Lotus Feet's niece, who wants to repatriate the mirror to China. Despite returning it to her, the mirror reappears at Lester's house which leads to a turnaround in his fortunes. He is able to repay his loan shark, Paulo, for his motorcycle before the latter, who had stared into the mirror hits his head against a hotdog cart and dies. He finds a wallet with a phone and an ATM card, which he redeems. His absentee father Robert then returns and they move into an affluent estate. Before he leaves the slum, Lester sees the ghost of Lotus Feet, the woman who cursed the bagua in her dying breath. Later that night, Lester's alcoholic mother Ruby dies after ingesting rat poison, revealing her to be born in the year of the Rat. This drives Lester to destroy the mirror. Joy, who is now a real estate agent, arrives for a transaction but leaves immediately when she sees the mirror, warning him not to accept any more good fortune. Upon returning to the door, he finds the mirror intact.

After Ruby's funeral, Jack, a loan shark whom Lester had crossed in the slum, breaks into Lester's house but encounters Robert. In the ensuing struggle Robert is stabbed to death, and Jack is killed with a fire extinguisher labeled "Red Rabbit." Lester realizes Robert and Jack were both born in the year of the Rabbit as Jack is wearing a violet polo shirt with a Playboy bunny logo in it. Joy, Lily (who owned the bagua mirror before Joy), and Hsui Liao go to Lester's house to talk about what happened after Lester stole the mirror. Hsui Liao realizes that the Bagua is haunting Lester as well as its previous living owners as it is about to complete collecting the souls of its 12 previous owners corresponding to their zodiac animal. Hsui Liao also realizes that when Lotus Feet's niece tried to pacify her aunt and died, her soul joined Lotus Feet in claiming a pair of victims, which explains the deaths of Robert and Jack, as well as Lester's companions in the slum, who were killed after being accused of Lester's earlier theft. When they go to the front of the house, the find the mirror missing. They then go to Lily's house, where the latter finds the mirror but conceals it from them, hoping to recover her good fortune. They go to the house of Joy's boyfriend Douglas, who shoots and injures Lester after mistaking him for a burglar. Douglas proposes to Joy, but the latter refuses after realizing that he had looked at the bagua mirror.

Hsui Liao realizes that the only way to end Lotus Feet's curse is to destroy the bagua mirror in the temple and persuades Douglas to accompany him, Joy and Lester to the temple. Meanwhile, Lily and her housemaid are killed after pulling an electric cable connected to a dragon fountain which they mistake to be a buried piece of gold, revealing her to be born in the Year of the Dragon. As they approach the temple, Douglas gets into a fight with residents after an accident and is mauled, Hsui Liao inadvertently looks at the mirror during the scuffle and is stabbed to death, falling on a pile of pork skins (chicharon) to signify his being born on the Year of the Pig and Lester is beaten up and stabbed near some dog cages, signifying his being born in the Year of the Dog. Finally, Lester and Joy reach the temple and destroy the bagua mirror together. After destroying the mirror, Joy notices Lester's dead body at the door of the temple, revealing that it was his ghost who helped her break the mirror. She mourns as the police and Douglas arrive,to Joy's surprise.

In the post credits scene, Lester's girlfriend Ellen uploads a photo of the bagua mirror sent by Lester for sale as her taxi suddenly encounters a truck with the words "Snake Island", indicating that she was born on the Year of the Snake.

Cast

Main
Kris Aquino as Joy Ramirez
Coco Martin as Lester Anonuevo

Supporting
Cherry Pie Picache as Lily Mendoza
Ian Veneracion as Douglas
Carmi Martin as Ruby Anonuevo
Rez Cortez as Robert Anonuevo
Joonee Gamboa as Hsui Liao
Beauty Gonzalez as Ellen
Ian De Leon as Jack
Martin Escudero as Moy
Raikko Mateo as Mio
Diana Zubiri as Woman whose ATM card was stolen by Lester
Teodoro Baldemaro as Boss Paulo
Elizabeth Chua as Lotus Feet's niece
Rosita Lim as Mei Lien/Lotus Feet
Kych Minemoto as Endon
Randy See as Leonard
Jenine Desiderio as the mother of the Twins
Froilan Sales as the father of the Twins
Joj and Jai Agpangan as the Twins

Production
The idea of a sequel was created after Coco Martin approached director Chito S. Roño and Kris Aquino about the first film. Being a fan of the original movie in 2004, Martin asked Aquino and Roño if they would be interested in a sequel, and said that he would be glad to join them. Roño and Aquino decided that after ten years, it was the right time for the sequel.

The shooting of the film was set to commence by late August 2014. With the first cut of the film, Joy's character (Kris Aquino) was not present for most of the story. Because of this, the producers asked for re-shoots, to give her additional screen time.

The first official trailer of the film was attached to the Star Cinema romantic comedy film Past Tense, which was released on November 22, 2014.

Reception
The film was met with high expectations by fans since the first movie had been a cult classic, considered the 'scariest Filipino horror film ever'.

The film received a mixed to positive response from critics, who cited the outstanding performances of Coco Martin and Cherry Pie Picache but said the film lacked the originality of the first movie. They also applauded Kris Aquino's performance, saying it was a great improvement from her past horror films.

Audiences received the film more positively, citing it as a worthy sequel.

Box office
The film became the second-highest-grossing film at the 2014 Metro Manila Film Festival. It now holds the title of having the highest opening gross of any non-MMFF Filipino horror film of all time, having earned a total of ₱235.0 million at the box office.

See also
List of ghost films

References

External links

2014 films
2014 horror films
Philippine ghost films
Philippine supernatural horror films
Star Cinema films
Filipino-language films